512 and 737 are North American telephone area codes serving Austin, Texas, and its suburbs. Counties currently served by these area codes include Bastrop, Burnet, Caldwell, Hays, Travis, Milam and Williamson.

Area code 512 was one of the original area codes established in October 1947.  At that time it covered most of the south-central portion of Texas, from the Gulf of Mexico to the Mexican border.  Besides Austin, it included San Antonio, Corpus Christi, Brownsville, Harlingen, and McAllen.

Despite the presence of San Antonio and Austin—the state's third- and fourth-largest cities, respectively, for most of the second half of the 20th century—this configuration remained in place for 45 years.  In 1992, the western part of its territory, including San Antonio and the Rio Grande Valley, became area code 210, making 512 the last of Texas' original four area codes to be split. Typically, the largest city in an existing area code keeps the original code, which in this case would have been San Antonio.  However, state regulators decided that having the Austin area keep 512 would spare the large number of state agencies in and around the state capital from the expense and disruption of changing their numbers.

On February 13, 1999, the 512 area code was reduced to its current size when the southern portion (including Corpus Christi) became 361.

To stave off exhaustion by the end of 2013, area code 737 was introduced as an overlay of 512 in July 2013.  Ten-digit dialing within the 512 territory was phased in beginning December 2012 and made mandatory since June 2013.

Service area
Area codes 512 and 737 serve the following municipalities:

 Austin
 Bastrop
 Bee Cave
 Bertram
 Briggs
 Buchanan Dam
 Buda
 Burnet
 Cedar Creek
 Cedar Park
 Coupland
 Dale
 Del Valle
 Driftwood
 Dripping Springs
 Elgin
 Fentress
 Georgetown 
 Granger
 Hutto
 Jarrell
 Kempner
 Kyle
 Lakeway
 Lampasas
 Leander
 Liberty Hill
 Lockhart
 Lometa
 Manchaca
 Manor
 Martindale
 Maxwell
 McDade
 McNeil
 Muldoon
 Pflugerville
 Prairie Lea
 Rockdale
 Round Rock
 San Marcos
 Smithville
 Spicewood
 Staples
 Taylor
 Thorndale
 Thrall
 Walburg
 Weir
 Wimberley

In popular culture 
In January 1995, Selena Quintanilla released "El Chico del Apartamento 512" (The Guy from Apartment 512). The "512" is a reference to the city of Corpus Christi, Texas' former area code.

See also
List of Texas area codes
List of future North American area codes

References

External links

List of exchanges from AreaCodeDownload.com, 512 Area Code

512
512